Melhus Idrettslag is a Norwegian sports club from Melhus, Sør-Trøndelag. It has sections for association football, team handball, volleyball, orienteering, Nordic skiing, weightlifting and powerlifting.

It was established on 28 February 1898.

The men's football team last played in the Second Division in 1996. The football teams of Melhus IL and Tiller IL started a cooperation after the 2012 season, and the team that was known as Melhus/Tiller in the 2013 season was promoted to the Second Division. Ahead of the 2014 season, the cooperation evolved into an own club which was named Rødde FK.

References

 Official site

External links
 Æestolt-banen - Nordic Stadiums

Football clubs in Norway
Sport in Trøndelag
Association football clubs established in 1898
1898 establishments in Norway